The 2012 Super Rugby season was the second season of the current 15-team format for the Super Rugby competition, which involves teams from Australia, New Zealand and South Africa. For sponsorship reasons, this competition is known as FxPro Super Rugby in Australia, Investec Super Rugby in New Zealand and Vodacom Super Rugby in South Africa. Including its past incarnations as Super 12 and Super 14, this was the 17th season for the Southern Hemisphere's premier transnational club competition. The conference games took place every weekend from 24 February until 14 July (with a three-week break between rounds 15 and 16 for international matches), followed by the finals series, culminating in the grand final on 4 August. While its three main broadcasting partners are Fox Sports (Australia), Sky Sport (New Zealand) and SuperSport (South Africa), Super Rugby can be viewed in many countries throughout the world.

The Chiefs, based in Hamilton, New Zealand, claimed their first-ever title in the competition's history, defeating the Durban-based Sharks 37–6 in the final held on 4 August at the Chiefs' home of Waikato Stadium.

Competition format

Covering 24 weeks, the schedule featured a total of 125 matches. The 15 teams are grouped by geography, labelled the Australian Conference, New Zealand Conference and the South African Conference. The regular season consists of two types of matches:
 Internal Conference Matches – Each team plays the other four teams in the same conference twice, home and away.
 Cross Conference Matches – Each team plays four teams of the other two conferences away, and four teams of the other two conferences home, thus missing out on two teams (one from each of the other conferences). Each team plays two home and two away games against teams from each of the other countries, making a total of eight cross conference games for each team. There will be a three-week international break between rounds 15 and 16 of the regular season.

The top team of each conference, plus the next top three teams in table points regardless of conference (wild card teams), advance to the finals. The top two conference winners, based on table points, receive first-round byes. In the first round of the finals, the third conference winner is the No. 3 seed and hosts the wild card team with the worst record, and the best wild card team hosts the second-best wild card team. In the semi-finals, the No. 2 conference winner hosts the higher surviving seed from the first round, and the No. 1 conference winner hosts the other first-round winner. The final is hosted by the top remaining seed.

Standings

Source: sanzarrugby.com

Legend:
 Rnd = Round completed (games played plus byes), W = Games won, D = Games drawn, L = Games lost, Bye = Number of byes, PF = Points for, PA = Points against, PD = Points difference, TF = Tries for, TA = Tries against, TB = Try bonus points, LB = Losing bonus points, Pts = Log points, Q = Qualification

Points breakdown:
 4 points for a win
 2 points for a draw
 4 points for a bye
 1 bonus point for a loss by seven points or less
 1 bonus point for scoring four or more tries in a match

The overall standings classification system:
 Three conference winners/leaders in log points order
 Three wildcard teams in log points order
 The remaining nine teams in log points order
 When teams are level on log points, they are sorted by number of games won, then overall points difference, then number of tries scored and then overall try difference

Round-by-round

Regular season

The following fixtures were released on 2 September 2011.

Round 1

Round 2

Round 3

Round 4

Round 5

Round 6

Round 7

Round 8

Round 9

Round 10

Round 11

Round 12

Round 13

Round 14

Round 15

Round 16

Round 17

Round 18

Finals

Qualifiers

Semi-finals

Final

Players

Leading try scorers

Source: South African Rugby Union

Leading point scorers

Source: South African Rugby Union

Referees

The following refereeing panel was appointed by SANZAR for the 2012 Super Rugby season:

Attendances

See also

 List of Super Rugby records
 Super Rugby franchise areas

Notes

 Australian crowd figures taken from SMH match reports.

References

External links
 
 
 
 

 
2012
 
 
 
2012 rugby union tournaments for clubs